The 2005 UEFA European Under-17 Championship was the fourth edition of UEFA's European Under-17 Football Championship. Italy hosted the championship, during 3–14 May. Turkey defeated Netherlands in the final to win the competition for the second time.

Squads

Qualifying

2005 UEFA European Under-17 Championship qualifying round

Match officials 
A total of 6 referees, 8 assistant referees and 2 fourth officials were appointed for the final tournament.

Referees
 Pavel Kralovec
 Jöuni Hietala
 Svein Oddvar Moen
 Pavel Cristian Balaj
 Pavel Olsiak
 Bernardino Gonzalez Vazquez

Assistant referees
 Vincent De Spiegeleer
 Henrik Sonderby
 Hannes Reinvald
 Ruslan Duzmambetov
 Konrad G. Borg
 Veaselav Berco
 Rafal Rostkowski
 Andriy Pryimak

Fourth officials
 Luca Banti
 Nicola Stefanini

Group stage

Group A

Group B

Knockout stage

Semi-finals

For winning their semi-finals, Netherlands and Turkey qualified for the 2005 FIFA U-17 World Championship with Italy and Croatia meeting in the third place playoff for the third and final place in the 2005 FIFA U-17 World Championship.

Third place play-off

For winning the third place play-off, Italy qualified for the 2005 FIFA U-17 World Championship with Croatia missing out.

Final

References

External links
UEFA.com
RSSSF.com

 
UEFA
UEFA European Under-17 Championship
International association football competitions hosted by Italy
UEFA
May 2005 sports events in Europe
2005 in youth association football